Ikíngut is a movie that was released in 2000.

The word means "Friend" in the native language and it is also a name given to children.

Synopsis
The film tells an extraordinary story of friendship. In the 19th-century, a small Eskimo boy living in Greenland reaches a remote village in Iceland on a broken iceberg. He meets a young boy named Buas, who is from a family in the village, and, by chance, saves him from the falling avalanche. The two kids become friends. People of the village, however, are superstitious, and believe that the awkward-looking Ikingut (named after the first word he uses) is an evil spirit. Therefore, Buas has to fight for his friend against those who want him to be imprisoned or even killed.

References

External links
 
 İkingut (Cineuropa)
 
2000 films
Icelandic adventure films
Greenlandic-language films
2000s Icelandic-language films
Norwegian children's films
Danish children's films
Norwegian adventure films
Danish adventure films